The 1992 Pyroil 500K was the 28th and penultimate stock car race of the 1992 NASCAR Winston Cup Series season, the 11th and final race of the 1992 NASCAR Winston West Series, and the fifth iteration of the event. The race was held on Sunday, November 1, 1992, before an audience of 80,000 in Avondale, Arizona at Phoenix International Raceway, a 1-mile (1.6 km) permanent low-banked tri-oval race track. The race took the scheduled 312 laps to complete. At race's end, Robert Yates Racing driver Davey Allison would manage to make a late-race charge late in the race, passing for the lead with 30 to go to retake the driver's championship points lead, assisted from a poor finish by the points leader heading into the race, Bill Elliott. The victory was Allison's 18th career NASCAR Winston Cup Series victory and his fifth and final victory of the season. To fill out the top three, Roush Racing driver Mark Martin and owner-driver Darrell Waltrip would finish second and third, respectively.

In the driver's championship for the 1992 NASCAR Winston Cup Series, heading into the final race of the season, the 1992 Hooters 500, six drivers were eligible to win the driver's championship, culminating into one of the closest championship battles in NASCAR Winston Cup Series history. Driver's championship leader Davey Allison would lead second-place driver Alan Kulwicki by 30 points and third-place driver Bill Elliott by 40 points. For Allison to clinch the championship, Allison would need to finish fifth or better at the Hooters 500. Second-place Kulwicki would need to win the race, lead the most laps, and for Allison to finish outside the top five to clinch the championship. Third-place Bill Elliott would need to win the race, lead the most laps, and for Allison to finish outside the top eight to win the championship. Additionally, three other drivers, considered long-shots to win the title, were also eligible to win the championship: Harry Gant, Kyle Petty, and Mark Martin.

In the driver's championship for the 1992 NASCAR Winston West Series, Spears Motorsports driver Bill Sedgwick, assisted by a poor finish by competitor Bill Schmitt, would manage to win the Winston West title by six points over Schmitt.

Background 

Phoenix International Raceway – also known as PIR – is a one-mile, low-banked tri-oval race track located in Avondale, Arizona. It is named after the nearby metropolitan area of Phoenix. The motorsport track opened in 1964 and currently hosts two NASCAR race weekends annually. PIR has also hosted the IndyCar Series, CART, USAC and the Rolex Sports Car Series. The raceway is currently owned and operated by International Speedway Corporation.

The raceway was originally constructed with a 2.5 mi (4.0 km) road course that ran both inside and outside of the main tri-oval. In 1991 the track was reconfigured with the current 1.51 mi (2.43 km) interior layout. PIR has an estimated grandstand seating capacity of around 67,000. Lights were installed around the track in 2004 following the addition of a second annual NASCAR race weekend.

Entry list 

 (R) denotes rookie driver.

Qualifying 
Qualifying was split into two rounds. The first round was held on Friday, October 30, at 5:30 PM EST. Each driver would have one lap to set a time. During the first round, the top 20 drivers in the round would be guaranteed a starting spot in the race. If a driver was not able to guarantee a spot in the first round, they had the option to scrub their time from the first round and try and run a faster lap time in a second round qualifying run, held on Saturday, October 31, at 2:00 PM EST. As with the first round, each driver would have one lap to set a time. For this specific race, positions 21-40 would be decided on time, and depending on who needed it, a select amount of positions were given to cars who had not otherwise qualified but were high enough in owner's points; which was one for cars in the NASCAR Winston Cup Series and two extra provisionals for the NASCAR Winston West Series. If needed, a past champion who did not qualify on either time or provisionals could use a champion's provisional, adding one more spot to the field.

Two drivers would fail to qualify.

Full qualifying results

Race results

Standings after the race 

Drivers' Championship standings

Note: Only the first 10 positions are included for the driver standings.

References 

1992 NASCAR Winston Cup Series
NASCAR races at Phoenix Raceway
November 1992 sports events in the United States
1992 in sports in Arizona